The 2018 Air Force Reserve Celebration Bowl was a college football bowl game that was played on December 15, 2018, with kickoff at 12:00 p.m. EST. It was the first game of the 2018–19 bowl season, and the only bowl to feature FCS teams. It was the fourth edition of the Celebration Bowl and the final game of the 2018 NCAA Division I FCS football season for the participating teams. The Air Force Reserve resumed its role as the title sponsor after a one-year absence.

In the game, the North Carolina A&T Aggies, champions of the Mid-Eastern Athletic Conference, defeated the Alcorn State Braves, champions of the Southwestern Athletic Conference, 24–22.

Teams
The participants for the game are based upon the final regular season standings which determine the Mid-Eastern Athletic Conference (MEAC) football champion, and the Southwestern Athletic Conference (SWAC) football championship game that determines the representative from that conference.

North Carolina A&T Aggies

The North Carolina A&T Aggies (NC A&T) were announced as the MEAC representative on November 17, following the conclusion of games involving itself and Florida A&M (FAMU), the conference front-runners. As outlined in the conference tiebreaker rules, due to defeating NC A&T earlier in the season, a FAMU victory at the Florida Classic would have given the Rattlers the Celebration Bowl bid and at least a share of the MEAC championship regardless of the outcome of NC A&T's game. However, FAMU lost the Florida Classic to arch-rival Bethune-Cookman, 33–19, while NC A&T defeated North Carolina Central, 45–0, giving them the conference championship and Celebration Bowl bid.

NC A&T, led by first-year head coach Sam Washington, entered the season ranked number 14 in the AFCA preseason poll, number 13 in the STATS FCS top 25 poll, and number one in the BoxtoRow polls as the defending HBCU National Champions. The Aggies were also unanimously picked as the favorites to repeat as MEAC champions. The Aggies finished their 2018 regular season at 9–2 (6–1 in MEAC)—with key victories over Ohio Valley Conference champion Jacksonville State and in-state FBS foe East Carolina—and entered the Celebration Bowl ranked number 11 by STATS. This was the third Celebration Bowl appearance for NC A&T, following their victory over the Grambling Tigers in the 2017 Celebration Bowl, 21–14.

Alcorn State Braves

Alcorn State defeated Southern in the SWAC Championship Game on December 1 to secure their berth in the Celebration Bowl. Led by third-year head coach Fred McNair, the Braves were ranked third in the BoxtoRow HBCU preseason poll, voted to win the SWAC East division. The Braves enter the bowl with a 9–3 record (6–1 in conference regular season play).

Game summary

Scoring summary

Statistics

References

External links
 Box score at ESPN

Celebration Bowl
Celebration Bowl
Alcorn State Braves football bowl games
North Carolina A&T Aggies football bowl games
Celebration Bowl
Celebration Bowl